Luena can refer to:
Luena, Cantabria, Spain
Luena Martínez, former member of British girl group RLY
Luena, Moxico Province, Angola
Luena people, Angola
Luena River (disambiguation)